Taras Shevchenko State Art School is a selective gymnasium school specializing in fine arts (painting, sculpture and architecture), in Kyiv, Ukraine. 
The school is part of the complex that also includes schools of ballet and music. It is located adjoining a historic park overlooking the southern end of Babi Yar. The school accepts students from 5th grade through to and including 12th grade.

History

The school was established on August 12, 1937, and was originally located at 2 Volodymyrska Street, Kyiv. The designer and builder of the new school building was the architect Joseph Karakis. At the time, this was the only art school building and institute of its type in the Soviet Union.

The first pupils graduated on 29 June 1940. Due to the threat of war with Germany, all graduates from this class as well as directors of the school were conscripted into the Soviet Army and sent to the Eastern Front.

The school was vacant until 1944 when the building was taken over by the National Museum of the History of Ukraine, and the school moved to new premises. Today, the school is located in 4 Zhambyl Zhabayuly Street, Kyiv.

Notable alumni

There are many notable artists among its graduates, including:
 Christina Katrakis
 Peter Kravchenko
 Oleg Kulik
 Kost Lavro
 Yuri Makoveychuk
 Alina Panova
 Les Podervyansky
 Vlada Ralko
 Arsen Savadov
 Mikhail Turovsky
 Roman Turovsky
 Glib Vysheslavsky
 Nicholas Zalevsky
 Galyna Zubchenko

References

External links
The school's website 

Educational institutions established in 1937
Schools in Kyiv
1937 establishments in Ukraine
Gymnasiums in Ukraine
Arts organizations established in 1937
Art schools in Ukraine